Shirley Jameson (March 29, 1918 – December 29, 1993) was an American center fielder who played from  through  in the All-American Girls Professional Baseball League. Listed at 4' 10¾" (1.49 m), 104 lb. (47 k), Jameson batted right-handed and threw left-handed. She was born in Maywood, Illinois.

Jameson was born in Maywood, Illinois. There she attended Proviso Township High School, graduating in 1935. In high school, Jameson was a superb athlete, who by her junior year was manager of the GAA's softball team. During the 1930s she became one of the elite speed skaters in the country, winning the Silver Skates in 1939, and the Illinois women's state titles in 1939 and 1940. At the same time she was competing in the flourishing Chicago amateur softball scene. After 1940, she dropped speed skating and focused on softball.

AAGPBL career
Of the original four players signed by Wrigley in 1943, Shirley Jameson was the second. The other two, besides Ann Harnett and Jameson, were Claire Schillace and Edythe Perlick. These players were carefully selected from the Chicago amateur softball association league to be the role models for the All American Girls' Professional League. The pickup of the right-center fielders, a second position peculiar to softball, was the diminutive Jameson, who had played for the Garden City Brew Maids. At twenty-three, with a middle-class background, she was a college graduate who was working as a physical education teacher in the Morrison, Illinois, school system.

Harnett, Jameson, Schillace and Perlick epitomized the carefully constructed image of feminine, attractive, well-manered ballplayers. Press releases and publicity photos showcased them. Notably, Jameson was one of the rare non-pitchers who threw left-handed but batted right-handed. Fast as lightning on the bases or in center field, she had a great throwing arm and was a competent leadoff hitter. Usually, opposing pitchers said she was one of the hardest hitters in the league, because of her small frame and her bat speed.

Jameson played from 1943 to 1946 with the Kenosha Comets. In the inaugural season, she led the league with 126 stolen bases and posted career-numbers in games (105), batting average (.271), hits (108), runs batted in (32), and runs scored (111). At the end of the season, she was selected for the All-Star Team.

A light hitter, Jameson posted a career .229 batting average in 385 games, which she compensated with a respectable .359 on-base percentage. She had the ability to get on base, by any means, way above than the pure hability to get the hit. She reached first base by walks, by a bunt single or being hit by the pitcher. A smart and aggressive baserunner, she stole 401 bases, but also knew when to take the additional base on an overthrow – 41 of her 313 hits were for extrabases, and also walked 279 times. Following her baseball career, she became a talent scout for the All-American.

The AAGPBL folded in 1954, but there is now a permanent display at the Baseball Hall of Fame and Museum since November 5,  that honors those who were part of this unforgettable experience. Jameson, along with the rest of the AAGPBL players, is now enshrined in the venerable building of Cooperstown, New York. She died in 1993 at the age of 75.

Career statistics
Batting

Fielding

Fact
The All-American girls were all superb athletes, but their all-male managers expected them to be more. The players were expected to be perfect ladies, as they had chaperones directing their every move. Her feminine uniforms included a knee-length skirt, and to top it all off they had a Charm School directed by Helena Rubinstein, who, with her chain of beauty salons, was synonymous with the feminine ideal.

Sources
 "Morrison Teacher's Picture in Magazine," Dispatch, August 21, 1942.
Encyclopedia of Women and Baseball – Leslie A. Heaphy, Laura Wulf, Mel Anthony May. Publisher: McFarland & Company, 2006. Format: Hardcover, 438pp. Language: English. 
Girls of Summer: The Real Story of the All American Girls Professional Baseball League – Lois Browne. Publisher: HarperCollins, 1992. Format: Hardcover, 212 pp. Language: English. 
Women in Baseball: The Forgotten History – Gai Ingham Berlage, Charley Gerard. Publisher: Greenwood Publishing Group, 1994. Format: Hardcover, 224pp. Language: English.

External links

Jackie Mitchell: The Girl Who Struck Out Babe Ruth

All-American Girls Professional Baseball League players
Kenosha Comets players
Baseball players from Illinois
1929 births
1993 deaths
Sportspeople from Maywood, Illinois
Place of death missing
20th-century American women